The 1995 FA Women's Cup Final was the 26th final of the FA Women's Cup, England's primary cup competition for women's football teams. It was the 26th final to be held under the direct control of the Football Association (FA).

Match

Summary
Arsenal defeated Liverpool 3–2.

References

External links
 
 Report at WomensFACup.co.uk

Women's FA Cup finals
Arsenal W.F.C. matches
Liverpool L.F.C. matches
Cup
April 1995 sports events in the United Kingdom